Philip DeWilde (July 10, 1972 – July 9, 2014) was a Canadian film and television actor.

Early life
DeWilde was born in Toronto, Ontario, Canada on July 10, 1972.

Career
He was most noted for his role in the film Turning Paige, for which he garnered a Genie Award nomination for Best Actor at the 23rd Genie Awards. His other credits included supporting and guest roles in the television series Mythic Warriors, RoboCop: Prime Directives and Mutant X, and the films Prince Charming, Don't Say a Word and Dawn of the Dead.

Personal life
On summer vacation, DeWilde spent the weekend on a vacation to St. Petersburg, Florida. However, he contracted a serious ailment and was taken to the hospital. DeWilde died on July 9, 2014 in St. Petersburg, Florida, one day before his 42nd birthday.

Filmography

Film

Television

References

External links

1972 births
2014 deaths
Canadian male film actors
Canadian male television actors
Canadian male voice actors
Male actors from Toronto